Speed skating is a sport that has been contested at the Winter Olympic Games since the inaugural Games in 1924. Events held at the first Winter Olympics included the men's 500-metre, 1500-metre, 5000-metre, and 10,000-metre races. Points from the four races were combined and counted towards the all-round event, which was dropped following the 1924 Olympics. Speed skating events for women were first held at the 1932 Winter Olympics, as part of the demonstration program. The organizing committee of those Games advocated for the full inclusion of the women’s events, but the IOC rejected that. The first official women's events were held in Squaw Valley 1960 with the 500-metre, 1000-metre, 1500-metre, and 3000-metre distances. The men's 1000-metre event was added in 1976 and the women's 5000-metre event was added in 1988. All 10 events have been held at every Olympic Games since, and a team pursuit event for both genders was added in 2006, for a total of 12 medal events.

Dutch skater Ireen Wüst has won eleven medals — five gold, five silver, and one bronze — more than any other speed skater at the Olympics. Lidiya Skoblikova, who represented the Soviet Union, is one of two female Winter Olympians to win six gold medals (cross-country skier Lyubov Yegorova is the other). At the 1924 Winter Olympics, Finn Clas Thunberg became the first athlete to win two or more gold medals; in 1928, he became the first speed skater to successfully defend an Olympic title. At the 1964 Games, Skoblikova won four gold medals and became the first athlete to win a gold in every available event.  The feat was repeated in 1980 by American Eric Heiden, who won five golds, the most that any Winter Olympian has won at one edition of the Games. In 2006, Canadian Cindy Klassen became the only other speed skater, and one of seven Winter Olympians, to win five medals—one gold, two silver, two bronze—at a single edition of the Games. Pechstein, American Bonnie Blair, and Sven Kramer of the Netherlands are the only speed skaters to win gold in the same event three times in a row. Andrea Schöne, who won a silver medal in 1976, is the youngest female athlete in an individual event to win a medal. German Christa Luding-Rothenburger and Canadian Clara Hughes are the only medal-winning speed skaters who have also won a medal at the Summer Olympic Games, having won medals in cycling.

Dutch speed skaters have been the most successful in terms of combined medals (121), as well as gold medals (42). After the 2018 Winter Olympics, 190 gold medals, 193 silver medals and 186 bronze medals have been awarded since 1924 and have been won by speed skaters from 23 National Olympic Committees.



Men

500 meters

1000 metres

1500 metres

5000 metres

10,000 metres

Mass start

Team pursuit

Women

500 metres

1000 metres

1500 metres

3000 metres

Medals:

5000 metres

Mass start

Medals:

Team pursuit

Medals:

Discontinued

Men's all-round

Medals:

Statistics

Athlete medal leaders

Medals per year

Key
Bolded numbers indicate the highest medal count at that year's Olympic Games.

Medal sweep events
These are podium sweep events in which athletes from one NOC won all three medals.

In the women's 1500 meters event at the 2014 Winter Olympics, Marrit Leenstra of the Netherlands finished in fourth position, making this the first, and only, time in Olympic speed skating history that athletes from one country have taken all of the top four positions in an event.

See also
 World Speed Skating Championships
 List of multiple Winter Olympic medallists

References
General
 

Specific

External links
 Speed Skating - Olympics at Sports-reference.com
 Olympic Review and Revue Olympique. LA84 Foundation

Speed skating
Medalists

Speed skating-related lists